Gary W. Gregor (born August 13, 1945) is an American former professional basketball player.

A  forward/center from the University of South Carolina, Gregor played in the National Basketball Association and American Basketball Association as a member of the Phoenix Suns (1968–1969), Atlanta Hawks (1969–1970), Portland Trail Blazers (1970–1972), Milwaukee Bucks (1972–1973), and New York Nets (1973–1974).  He earned NBA All-Rookie Team honors in 1969 after averaging 11.1 points per game and 8.9 rebounds per game for the Suns.

Career statistics

NBA

Regular season 

|-
| align="left" | 1968–69
| align="left" | Phoenix
| 80 || - || 27.3 || .415 || - || .649 || 8.9 || 1.2 || - || - || 11.1
|-
| align="left" | 1969–70
| align="left" | Atlanta
| 81 || - || 19.8 || .433 || - || .779 || 4.9 || 0.8 || - || - || 8.1
|-
| align="left" | 1970–71
| align="left" | Portland
| 44 || - || 26.2 || .430 || - || .663 || 7.6 || 1.8 || - || - || 9.6
|-
| align="left" | 1971–72
| align="left" | Portland
| 82 || - || 28.9 || .451 || - || .755 || 7.2 || 2.3 || - || - || 11.1
|-
| align="left" | 1972–73
| align="left" | Milwaukee
| 9 || - || 9.8 || .333 || - || .714 || 3.6 || 1.0 || - || - || 3.0
|- class="sortbottom"
| style="text-align:center;" colspan="2"| Career
| 296 || - || 25.0 || .431 || - || .715 || 7.0 || 1.5 || - || - || 9.8
|}

Playoffs 

|-
| align="left" | 1969–70
| align="left" | Atlanta
| 7 || - || 9.6 || .286 || - || .667 || 2.4 || 0.3 || - || - || 2.3
|- class="sortbottom"
| style="text-align:center;" colspan="2"| Career
| 7 || - || 9.6 || .286 || - || .667 || 2.4 || 0.3 || - || - || 2.3
|}

ABA

Regular season 

|-
| align="left" | 1972–73
| align="left" | New York
| 40 || - || 14.9 || .485 || 1.000 || .821 || 3.8 || 0.8 || - || - || 5.8
|-
| align="left" | 1973–74
| align="left" | New York
| 25 || - || 12.5 || .471 || .667 || .818 || 2.8 || 0.6 || 0.2 || 0.0 || 3.6
|- class="sortbottom"
| style="text-align:center;" colspan="2"| Career
| 65 || - || 14.0 || .481 || .750 || .820 || 3.4 || 0.7 || 0.2 || 0.0 || 5.0
|}

Playoffs 

|-
| align="left" | 1972–73
| align="left" | New York
| 1 || - || 12.0 || .167 || .000 || 1.000 || 4.0 || 0.0 || - || - || 4.0
|- class="sortbottom"
| style="text-align:center;" colspan="2"| Career
| 1 || - || 12.0 || .167 || .000 || 1.000 || 4.0 || 0.0 || - || - || 4.0
|}

External links

1945 births
Living people
American men's basketball players
Atlanta Hawks players
Basketball players from West Virginia
Centers (basketball)
Milwaukee Bucks players
New York Knicks draft picks
New York Nets players
People from Charles Town, West Virginia
People from South Charleston, West Virginia
Phoenix Suns draft picks
Phoenix Suns players
Portland Trail Blazers players
Power forwards (basketball)
South Carolina Gamecocks men's basketball players
South Charleston High School alumni